Tollius setosus is a species of broad-headed bug in the family Alydidae. It is found in North America.

References

Alydinae